Chemudulanka is a village in Alamuru Mandal in East Godavari District of Andhra Pradesh, India.

References

Villages in East Godavari district